Vincent Mark "Sparky" Matejka is an American rock guitarist. He joined Lynyrd Skynyrd in 2006, replacing Hughie Thomasson who had left to reform Outlaws. He first played with the band on their Christmas Time Again album in 2000 and was credited with guitar and vocals.

Biography 
Matejka graduated from James E. Taylor High School, in Katy, Texas.

Prior to joining Lynyrd Skynyrd, Matejka was a member of Hot Apple Pie, a country music band. He also played for Charlie Daniels Band and Sons of the Desert.

He played guitar on tour with the Kinleys in 1998.

References 

American country guitarists
American male guitarists
American rock guitarists
Lead guitarists
Living people
Lynyrd Skynyrd members
Hot Apple Pie members
People from Katy, Texas
American people of Czech descent
University of North Texas College of Music alumni
Guitarists from Texas
20th-century American guitarists
The Charlie Daniels Band members
Blues rock musicians
Year of birth missing (living people)